Delusion is a 1991 American crime thriller film directed by Carl Colpaert.

Plot
An embezzler driving through the Nevada desert picks up a Las Vegas showgirl and her psychotic boyfriend after their vehicle crashes. The boyfriend, a not-very-bright hitman, has no intention of letting him get away with the stolen cash. The philosophy of Friedrich Nietzsche plays a minor role toward the film's end.

References

External links

1991 films
American crime thriller films
1991 crime thriller films
American neo-noir films
1990s English-language films
Films directed by Carl Colpaert
1990s American films